Petko Rosenov Hristov (born 1 March 1999) is a Bulgarian professional footballer who plays as a centre-back for  club Venezia, on loan from Spezia. He represents the Bulgaria national team.

Career

Slavia Sofia
Hristov started his career in Levski Sofia, before relocating to Slavia Sofia in 2013. He made his senior debut for Slavia in a match of the Europa League against Polish club Zagłębie Lubin on 30 June 2016, coming on as a substitute for Georgi Yomov. A month later he made his Bulgarian First League debut in the opening game of the season against CSKA Sofia. He scored his first goal on 10 September in a 5–2 home win over Lokomotiv Plovdiv. On 1 October Petko was joined by his twin brother Andrea Hristov in the central defense for the very first time against Vereya in the starting line-up.

On 3 April 2017, Hristov signed his first professional contract with the club until 31 July 2020.

Fiorentina
On 17 July 2017, Fiorentina confirmed they had signed Hristov on a five-year contract after Firenze Viola, Fiorentina owner, himself liked the player after seeing him in action at the European Under-19 Championship. On 20 August 2017, he was on the bench for the first time in the Serie A match against Inter Milan. He made his unofficial debut for the club against Real Madrid on 24 August coming on as a substitute in added time for the Trofeo Bernabeu game.

Ternana (loan)
On 16 August 2018, Hristov joined to Serie C club Ternana on loan until 30 June 2019. He scored his first goal for the club on 4 December 2018 in a league match against Rimini won by Ternana by 3:0.

Bisceglie (loan)
On 9 August 2019, Hristov joined Serie C club Bisceglie on loan until 30 June 2020.

Pro Vercelli (loan)
On 18 September 2020, Hristov joined Serie C club Pro Vercelli on loan until 30 June 2021.

Spezia
After his good performance for Pro Vercelli in Serie C, on 5 July 2021 Hristov moved to Serie A team Spezia, signing a contract until 2025. He made his debut for the team on 13 August in a Coppa Italia match against Pordenone and compleated his Serie A debut on 23 August in a match against Cagliari.

Venezia (loan)
On 26 January 2023, Hristov was loaned to Venezia for the rest of the 2022–23 season.

International career

Youth levels
Hristov was called up for the Bulgaria U19 team for the 2017 European Under-19 Championship qualification from 22 to 27 March 2017. After a draw and 2 wins the team qualified for the knockout phase which was held in July 2017. Petkov played in the all 3 matches from the group stage when Bulgaria were eliminated.

On 5 September 2017, he made his debut for the Bulgaria U21 in a match against Luxembourg U21.

Senior team
He made his debut for Bulgaria national football team on 31 March 2021 in a World Cup qualifier against Northern Ireland. His twin brother Andrea made his debut in the same game as well.

Personal life
Petko Hristov has a twin brother, Andrea, who is also a professional footballer.

Career statistics

Club

Style of play
Hristov was described from the Italian media as a physically strong defender with great air abilities and being able to read the game which has led him to be compared to legendary Brazilian defender Thiago Silva.

Awards

Individual
 Bulgarian Youth Footballer of the Year (1): 2016

References

1999 births
Living people
Bulgarian footballers
Bulgaria under-21 international footballers
Bulgaria youth international footballers
Association football defenders
PFC Slavia Sofia players
ACF Fiorentina players
Ternana Calcio players
A.S. Bisceglie Calcio 1913 players
F.C. Pro Vercelli 1892 players
Spezia Calcio players
Venezia F.C. players
Serie A players
Serie C players
First Professional Football League (Bulgaria) players
Footballers from Sofia
Bulgarian twins
Twin sportspeople
Bulgarian expatriate footballers
Expatriate footballers in Italy
Bulgarian expatriate sportspeople in Italy
Bulgaria international footballers